Mourad Meghni (born 16 April 1984) is a former professional footballer who played as an attacking midfielder or winger. He was known for his excellent technique. As a young footballer in France, his ability and Algerian heritage earned him the nickname "petit Zidane".

Aged thirteen, Meghni joined the famous academy Le Centre Technique National Fernand Sastre, commonly referred to as Clairefontaine. He decided to leave the academy at the age of 16 and signed for Cannes, where he only remained for one season and opted to move on to Bologna, for whom he made his professional debut on 20 July 2002, against FC BATE in the Intertoto Cup, coming on as a substitute. With Bologna, he came runner-up in the 2002 Intertoto Cup losing out to Fulham on aggregate 5–3. In the summer of 2007, Meghni signed with Lazio on a co-ownership deal for €1.75 million, with the club further paying Bologna an additional €1.75 million for full ownership, in the summer of 2008. He won the 2008–09 Coppa Italia, as well as the 2009 Supercoppa Italiana whilst playing for Lazio.

Meghni is a former French youth international and was a part of the team that won the 2001 FIFA U-17 World Championship, held in Trinidad and Tobago. He opted to play for Algeria at senior level in August 2009, taking advantage of FIFA's new ruling, allowing him to change his national allegiance despite being older than 21 years of age. He made his debut for Algeria in a 1–0 win on 12 August 2009, against Uruguay. He went on to play for Algeria at the 2010 Africa Cup of Nations in Angola.

Early life
Meghni was born on 16 April 1984 in Paris to Ali and Anna, an Algerian father and a Portuguese mother. His father during an interview spoke about how Mourad had been attracted by football at a very early age and that he used to take him to football stadiums very often notably to encourage his older brother Saïd who preceded him on the football pitches. His father also spoke on how Mourad joined several football training schools at an early age including that of Tursi and FC Nantes in France where he made impressive and swift progress as a budding player. His mother stated during the interview that she had always made it her duty together with her husband to visit Algeria every year to get together with all the family members and friends in the family home of Ouled Hadadj.

At the age of 13 Meghni joined the national football school at Clairefontaine there he vastly improved his technique, prior to joining the academy Meghni always played on small pitches hence he learnt quickly the necessary skills and technique that would be needed when beating a man, whilst at Clairefontaine he had a Brazilian coach who helped him improve his technique which became known for. Meghni remained at the national football school at Clairefontaine for three years before moving to Cannes at the age of 16.

When he was 16, Meghni decided to leave the Clairefontaine academy and sign for Cannes, but due to financial problems Cannes were immediately relegated to amateur football. Meghni had an unsuccessful time at Cannes as he was usually on the substitute bench for the reserve team, but in the summer of 2000 he was snapped up by Bologna at the age of 16 on a free transfer. Meghni views his time at Cannes as a learning experience as he was very young when he signed for the club.

Club career

Bologna
As a youth player, Meghni moved from the renowned Clairefontaine academy to Bologna, where he played from the 2000–01 season to the 2004–05 season. He made his Serie A debut on 12 January 2003 in a 2–0 loss at home to Milan. Meghni then spent the 2005–06 season on loan to French Ligue 1 side Sochaux, before returning to Bologna.

While at Bologna, Meghni was never able to turn his talent into success and consistency, and as such was never a favourite among the fans. He made a statement following Bologna's relegation to Serie B, in which he declared he would never play in what he considered to be a sub-standard competition. He did spend a year in Serie B, his last at the club, where he was a regular for the entire season, yet only found the net twice.

Lazio
In the 2007–08 season, Meghni joined Lazio on a co-ownership deal for €1.75 million fee. His early performances for the Biancocelesti were not impressive, and he failed to nail down a regular place in the line-up, only starting seven matches for the season. He did make his debut in the UEFA Champions League, setting up a crucial goal for Tommaso Rocchi, which gave the club their only win in the competition, at home to Werder Bremen. In June 2008 the co-ownership was renewed, but in July, Meghni was fully bought by Lazio from Bologna for another €1.75 million. (as part of the deal of Gaby Mudingayi) After the arrival of Matuzalém, and due to many injury's, Meghni became a backup player, and in December 2009 injured. His contract with Lazio was mutually terminated on 10 June 2011.

Umm Salal
After a four-year stint playing for the Rome-based club, Meghni joined the Qatar Stars League outfit Umm-Salal on 11 June 2011.

Al Khor
On 29 March 2012, it was announced Meghni would join Al Khor on a temporary loan.

Lekhwiya
On 6 July 2012, Meghni moved from Umm Salal to league rival Lekhwiya SC on a free transfer.

International career
On 12 August 2009, Meghni was selected for the first time to join the ranks of the Algeria national team, in a game facing Uruguay (Algeria won on a score of 1–0).

Meghni was not be in Algeria's final World Cup squad after being informed that his knee injury had not sufficiently healed and would require surgery despite the great lengths that both the player and the Fennecs medical team had gone to give him a chance of recovering in time.

Personal life
Meghni's father, Ammi Ali, is Algerian while his mother, Anna, is a Portuguese national. He is married. His older brother, Saïd Meghni, was also a footballer and played briefly in Portugal for Tirsense and Moreirense, in the 1999–2000 season, and then in Italy for Bologna's primavera team.

Career statistics

Honours
Bologna
 UEFA Intertoto Cup: runner-up 2002

Lazio
Coppa Italia: 2008–09
Supercoppa Italiana: 2009

France U17
FIFA U-17 World Cup: 2001

References

External links
 
 UEFA profile
 

1984 births
Living people
Footballers from Paris
Association football midfielders
Algerian footballers
French footballers
Algeria international footballers
France youth international footballers
France under-21 international footballers
2010 Africa Cup of Nations players
US Torcy players
AS Cannes players
INF Clairefontaine players
Bologna F.C. 1909 players
FC Sochaux-Montbéliard players
S.S. Lazio players
Umm Salal SC players
Al-Khor SC players
Lekhwiya SC players
CS Constantine players
Ligue 1 players
Serie A players
Serie B players
Qatar Stars League players
French sportspeople of Algerian descent
French people of Portuguese descent
Algerian people of Portuguese descent
Algerian expatriate footballers
Algerian expatriate sportspeople in Italy
Expatriate footballers in Italy
Algerian expatriate sportspeople in Qatar
Expatriate footballers in Qatar